"Fogbound" is the fifth single by Japanese electronica/rock band Boom Boom Satellites. It was initially released on Mars 8, 2000, as the first single from their second album Umbra.

The song Fogbound is also on the OST for the game Ridge Racer V.

Track listing

References

External links 
 Boom Boom Satellites official website

2001 songs
Boom Boom Satellites songs